Amandasig is a suburb of the mainplace Akasia in Gauteng, South Africa. It is situated to the north west of the Pretoria CBD, on the slopes of the Magaliesberg.

It used to be a predominantly Afrikaans speaking suburb for many young white residents, but the demography has changed since the end of apartheid in 1994. During Apartheid, Amandasig was a "Whites Only" area, as determined by the time's government. This Area is not situated far from the North West province, nor Pretoria CBD. Amandasig has much uncapped historical significance. This area is in close proximity to the unfortunately shadowed Theo Martins Poort, placed between the Magaliesburg; which had visual religious, and recreational chalk and paint markings.

References

Suburbs of Pretoria